The 2000 FAI 1000 was a race for V8 Supercars, held on 19 November 2000 at the Mount Panorama Circuit just outside Bathurst in New South Wales Australia. The race was the thirteenth and final round of the 2000 Shell Championship Series. It the fourth running of the Australia 1000, first held after the organisational split over the Bathurst 1000 that occurred in 1997. It was the 43rd race that traces its lineage back to the 1960 Armstrong 500 held at Phillip Island.

Pole position was claimed by Craig Lowndes and Mark Skaife driving a Holden Commodore VT for the Holden Racing Team, with the race victory going to Garth Tander and Jason Bargwanna in a similar Holden for Garry Rogers Motorsport. It was held in mostly wet conditions which resulted in several safety car periods. As a result, the average race speed of the winning car was the slowest since the 1974 Bathurst 1000.

Entry list

Report
Thanks to a weeks' worth of rain and a record-breaking 13 safety cars the time it was the slowest 1000 since 1974, when the rain that day in the last 50 laps was torrential. The race itself would become one of the all time classics. Several drivers spun off on their shootout lap on Saturday giving Wayne Gardner, who had spent most of the previous two years racing for Toyota in the Japanese GT Championship instead of V8's, pole position. His co-driver Neal Bates should have been very good in the conditions, but flew off the road at McPhillamy Park early in his first stint and the 2nd Glenn Seton Racing cars' day was done prematurely.

The defending champions in Steven Richards and Greg Murphy much like in 1999 didn't make the top 10 in qualifying but quickly made up ground in the race. However overheating problems for the #7 car slowed their pace on track and forced them throughout the race to add in buckets of ice and water to cool the engine, and the chance for Richards to get his 3rd Bathurst win in a row and Murphys' 3rd in 5 years evaporated away, but they drove well enough to just keep the #17 Johnson/McLean car behind at the end of the race.

The #9 Stone Brothers Racing Falcon with veteran Tony Longhurst and rookie David Besnard had a dramatic day; Longhurst spun off very early in the race, made contact with the wall resulting in bent steering, made 9 pitstops when only 4 were compulsory, have their car catch fire at one point and yet still led the race with 11 laps to go until Longhurst made contact with Adam Macrow and both cars ended up in the wall. From there Garth Tander took the race lead and win, holding off a vengeful Paul Radisich after his late-race retirement a year earlier.

Going into the race the championship battle between Tander and Mark Skaife was still to be decided; if Tander won Skaife would need to finish 17th or better to win the title. The Holden Racing Team duo of Skaife and Craig Lowndes were battling Neil Crompton and Glenn Seton for the lead more than two-thirds of the race distance in until on pit straight at the start of lap 114 BTCC ace Matt Neal, 3 laps down and having just been passed by Crompton, decided to start racing them and dived up the inside of race leader Crompton exiting the first corner on the outside and ahead of Crompton and briefly leaving the track. This led to Skaife colliding with Crompton in turn 1 with Skaife's Commodore ripping the front bodywork off Crompton's Falcon which was forced off the left of the track on pit exit. Damage to the right rear wheel well of the Commodore required pitting to repair as it lead to severe tyre wear and a puncture. Neal was given a 60-second stop and go penalty shortly afterwards. Skaife recovered to 6th and claimed his 3rd ATCC/V8 Supercars championship while Crompton finished three laps down.

The race marked the last of many Bathurst entries for privateer Terry Finnigan (whose car had an engine failure during the warm-up and thus did not start) and 1987 Bathurst winner David Parsons, among many other smaller names as the series slowly began to cull the less professional entries.

Results

Pre-qualifying

Qualifying

Top ten shootout

Starting grid

Race

Statistics
 Provisional Pole Position - #1 Mark Skaife - 2:11.8882
 Pole Position - #6 Wayne Gardner - 2:28.3844
 Fastest Lap - #1 Craig Lowndes - 2:14.2602
 Average Speed - 135 km/h

References

External links
 Official V8 Supercar website
 2000 FAI 1000 V8 Supercars race results, www.uniquecarsandparts.com.au
 Photos from Autopics.com
 Natsoft Race Results

FAI 1000
Motorsport in Bathurst, New South Wales